Yuhanna ibn Bukhtishu (Johannes Bukhtishu) was a 9th-century Persian or Syriac physician from Khuzestan, Persia. 
 
Yuhanna ibn Bukhtishu‘ (or Bakhtishu‘) was a member of a prominent family of Nestorian Christian physicians originally from Jundishapur in Khuzastan who worked in Baghdad from the 8th through the 10th centuries.  The name is composite of middle Persian Bukht (saved) and Syriac Ishu' (Jesus), which means saved by Jesus or one whose saviour is Jesus. 

Yuhanna ibn Bukhtishu was the illegitimate son of Jabril Ibn Bukhtishu (d. 870CE) who was physician to the caliphs al-Ma'mun, al-Wathiq and Al-Mutawakkil in Baghdad. 

Ibn Bukhtishu‘, who worked in Baghdad about 892CE, is known to have written a treatise on astrological knowledge necessary for a physician, but the treatise is now lost. It is uncertain whether he was in fact the author of a treatise on materia medica that is attributed to him in the extant copies, of which The National Library of Medicine has one.

See also
List of Iranian scientists
Bukhtishu, Abdollah ibn.
Bukhtishu, Gabriel ibn.
Bukhtishu

Further reading
Manfred Ullmann, Die Medizin im Islam, Handbuch der Orientalistik, Abteilung I, Ergänzungsband vi, Abschnitt 1 (Leiden: E.J. Brill, 1970), p. 111
Fuat Sezgin, Medizin-Pharmazie-Zoologie-Tierheilkunde bis ca 430 H., Geschichte des arabischen Schrifttums, Band 3 (Leiden: E.J. Brill, 1970), p. 258
Ibn Abi Usaybi'ah, 'Uyun al-anba' fi tabaqat al-atibba', ed. A. Müller, 2 vols. (Cairo and Königsberg: al-Matba'ah al-Wahbiyah, 1882–1884) vol. I p. 202.

For the family of physicians, see Lutz Richter-Bernburg, "Boktisu" in Encyclopædia Iranica, ed. Ehsan Yarshater, 6+ vols. (London: Routledge & Kegan Paul and Costa Mesa: Mazda, 1983 to present), vol. 4, pp 333–336.

Notes

Physicians from the Abbasid Caliphate
9th-century Iranian physicians
Members of the Assyrian Church of the East
Iranian Christians
Iranian Assyrian people
People from Khuzestan Province